Martviri the Iberian or Sabatsmindeli was a Georgian calligrapher, monk and writer of the 6th century.

Martviri was a priest of Mar Saba and foreman of Saint Sabbas the Sanctified.

Martviri's works were famous of being rich with Asceticism and Mysticism.

Martviri's works are included in the library of Saint Catherine's Monastery of Mount Sinai and Georgian-built Iviron monastery of Mount Athos.

He is the author of "სინანულისათჳს და სიმდაბლისა" (For repentance and humility), where he discusses the importance of prayer, repentance, humility, obedience, brotherhood and patience.

References

Writers from Georgia (country)
Calligraphers from Georgia (country)
6th-century calligraphers
Christian monks from Georgia (country)